The Museo Horne is a museum focusing on art and furnishings of the 14th and 15th centuries, located in the former Palazzo Corsi, on via de' Benci number 6 in Florence, Tuscany, Italy.

History of the Palazzo Corsi-Horne
Buildings at the site were known from the early 14th century. In 1489, the site with large house was ceded by the Alberti family to Simone and Luigi di Jacopo Corsi. Over the period of 1495–1502, the structure was rebuilt with designs attributed to either Giuliano da Sangallo or more likely Simone del Pollaiolo with the sculptural help of the studio/followers of Baccio d'Agnolo or Benedetto da Rovezzano.

In 1911, the architect and art historian Herbert Percy Horne acquired the Palazzo Corsi on via de' Benci, in order to house his early Renaissance collections. He willed his collections and the palace to the state, with the stipulation that it be made into a museum and foundation.

Catalogue of works on display

References

Further reading

Palaces in Florence
Renaissance architecture in Florence
Art museums and galleries in Florence